The bust of David Oppenheimer, mayor of Vancouver from 1888 to 1891, is installed in Vancouver's Stanley Park, in British Columbia, Canada.

References

External links
 

Busts in Canada
Monuments and memorials in Vancouver
Outdoor sculptures in Vancouver
Sculptures of men in Canada
Stanley Park